The 2021 Southern Conference women's basketball tournament was held March 4–7, 2021, at the Harrah's Cherokee Center in Asheville, North Carolina.

Seeds
Teams are seeded by record within the conference, with a tiebreaker system to seed teams with identical conference records.

Schedule
All tournament games are streamed on  ESPN+. The championship was televised across the region on select Nexstar stations and simulcast on ESPN+.

Bracket
 All times are Eastern.

See also
2021 Southern Conference men's basketball tournament

References

2020–21 Southern Conference women's basketball season
SoCon women's
College basketball tournaments in North Carolina
SoCon women's
Southern Conference women's basketball tournament
Southern Conference women's basketball tournament